All About 2PM is the first compilation album by South Korean boy band 2PM. It was released on March 9, 2011.

It is a compilation of:
Hottest Time of the Day,
2:00PM Time for Change,
01:59PM,
Don't Stop Can't Stop, and
Still 2:00PM.

Also in this boxset are:
a DVD,
a T-shirt,
postcards, and
six mobile straps with each member's name.

Track listing

Disc 1

Disc 2

Disc 3

Disc 4

Disc 5

References

2011 compilation albums
2PM albums
Korean-language albums